Utetheisa connerorum is a moth of the family Erebidae. It is endemic to the Galapagos archipelago, where it is the most widespread of all Utetheisa species. It has been found on Baltra, Fernandina, Floreana, Genovesa, Isabela, Marchena, Pinta, San Cristóbal, Santa Cruz, Santa Fé, and Santiago.

The length of the forewings is 12–15 mm for males and 12–14 mm for females.

The caterpillars feed on Tournefortia rufo-sericea, Tournefortia psilostachya, Tournefortia pubescens and Heliotropium curassavicum. The larva is solitary and draws leaves together, fastening their edges, for concealment. Larval specimens have been collected from May to November.

The food plants contain pyrrolizidine alkaloids, which are also stored in the adult moths. These pyrrolizidine alkaloids make the moths unpalatable to the orb-weaving spiders of Eustela vegeta, which release moths that are given to them from their webs. Lava lizards (Microlophus pacificus), however, eat the moths presented to them, suggesting that the endemic nocturnal Utetheisa of Galapagos have lost their aposematic colouration to avoid diurnal lizard predation, but retained their chemical defenses to avoid nocturnal spider predation.

References

External links

connerorum
Moths described in 2009